The Blue Gum Forest is a  forest located in Blue Mountains National Park within the Grose Valley of the Blue Mountains in New South Wales west of Sydney, southeastern Australia. It is one of the best-known bushwalking sites in Australia. The forest is located within the UNESCO World Heritage Site known as the Greater Blue Mountains Area. The forest survived through the efforts of early Australian conservationists.

Natural history

The forest consists predominantly of towering Mountain blue gum (Eucalyptus deanei) trees, with an understory of shrubs. The forest can be accessed only on foot, with several trails from different parts of the Grose Valley and adjacent canyons meeting in the forest. The most direct route into the forest from Blackheath is by the Perrys Lookdown track, which descends  to the forest. The return walk uphill is rated as "hard".

Being over 600 years old, it is a local landmark for bushwalkers. Because of the effects of trampling, camping is permitted at nearby Acacia Flat, not in the Blue Gum Forest itself.

Flora 
While the forest is dominated by Eucalyptus deanei, other eucalyptus trees are present. Smaller trees and shrubs include paperbarks (Melaleuca styphelioides), various acacias and the Yellow Pittosporum (Pittosporum revolutum). Grasses, vines, orchids (Caladenia picta), and ferns grow on the forest floor.

Fauna 
Common brushtail possums, greater gliders, eastern grey kangaroos, spotted-tail quoll and rock wallabies are some of the many mammal species in the forest. Birds are often encountered, either at the forest floor or in and above the canopy. Parrots such as the crimson rosella and yellow-tailed black cockatoo are conspicuous.

Fire 
Most of the trees are considered to be around 300 years old, possibly originating from a large bush fire. Regular light or moderate fires promote eucalyptus regeneration and stop the invasion of rainforest trees, but severe fires damage the forest. The Grose Valley has been affected by bushfires at various times, notably in 1982 and in November 2006. In particular the Blue Gum Forest was damaged by back burning. Following the harsh bushfires in 2006, the Blue Gum Forest and other walking tracks in the valley were closed to bushwalkers to allow the regrowth of vegetation.

History

Indigenous Australians 
In 1804, the explorer George Caley climbed nearby Mount Banks, and noticed camp fires from Indigenous Australians. The Blue Mountains was part of the territories of the Darug people. There is also evidence of associations of the more westerly Wiradjuri and the southern Gandangara people with the Blue Mountains. Aboriginal tool-making and signs of occupation have been found in the Grose Valley, some of it close to the Blue Gum Forest.

1850s and 1860s 
In around 1858, the Royal Engineers built  of bridle track for the proposed railway line. However, this was abandoned in favour of the current line on the ridge. The Engineers Track, as it was known, became a navigational point for walkers, farmers and explorers.  Robert Hunt took some of the earliest Australian photographs in the forest in 1859. Ben Carver, a cattle rustler, also used the track in the 1860s, and later bought a lease on the area in 1875. Only a small section of the Engineers Track survives today.

Artist's camp and the Horderns 
In 1875, the Blue Gum Forest was the scene of an artists’ camp established by Frederick Eccleston Du Faur of the Academy of Art. Over twenty artists, photographers and academics camped in the forest. Several photographs by Alex Bischoff, and drawings and paintings by William Piguenit resulted. Another outcome was that the whole Grose Valley and surrounds was reserved from alienation because it was ‘a national spectacle’. At the time there was no national park in Australia, and indeed Australia was not even a nation—but the reservation was the country’s first "national park". However, this reservation status did not stop subsequent threats to the forest. The wealthy retail family the Horderns purchased a lease in the Blue Gum Forest, though they had no plans to develop the area. Jokingly, this part of the valley was known as "the Hordern Pavilion".

Early conservation 

The Grose Valley became the cradle of the modern conservation movement in New South Wales when the Blue Gum Forest was saved from threatened destruction in 1931–32. At Easter in 1931, a group from the Sydney Bush Walkers Club, led by Alan Rigby, were camped in the forest when they chanced upon a Bilpin farmer, Clarrie Hungerford. Hungerford had a lease of the forest and told the bushwalkers he planned to clear the blue gums to plant walnuts.  Other threats to the forest included a proposed railway line, a dam, a power station and mining for coal and shale.

The bushwalkers went away and started a campaign to stop him. Eventually, they raised A£130 which they paid Hungerford in exchange for his relinquishing the lease. They met with Hungerford at the Blue Gum Forest on 15 November 1931 in pouring rain, and he agreed with their suggestion. It was a substantial amount at the height of the great depression. A£80 came in the form of an interest-free loan from James Cleary, then head of the NSW railways and later chairman of the Australian Broadcasting Commission. Cleary was also a bushwalker. One of the key activists in the campaign was Myles Dunphy, who at the time was developing his plans for the Blue Mountains National Park.

See also

 Protected areas of New South Wales
 Blue Mountains walking tracks

References

External links 
Penrithweb.com: Panorama of the Blue Gum Forest

Forests of New South Wales
Parks and reserves of the Blue Mountains (New South Wales)
Australian art